St. Margaret's Chapel is a pilgrimage chapel at St. Margarethen in the municipality of Münchwilen in the Canton of Thurgau in Switzerland.

References
 Mathis, H.P., 1988: Die Kapelle St. Margaretha in St. Margarethen TG. Bern 1988: Gesellschaft für Schweizerische Kunstgeschichte

Chapels in Switzerland
Buildings and structures in Thurgau